Strait Out of the Box: Part 2 is the second box set album by American country music artist George Strait. It contains three albums worth of music, dating from 1996 up to 2016. The albums consist of 26 number one singles, 18 album cuts, and 2 new tracks that were co-written by Strait.

Track listing

Chart performance

Weekly charts

Year-end charts

References 

2016 compilation albums
George Strait compilation albums
MCA Records compilation albums
Albums produced by Tony Brown (record producer)
Albums produced by Chuck Ainlay